Habib Selmi (Tunisian Arabic: حبيب السالمي) (born 31 January 1951) is a Tunisian novelist and short story writer.

Early life
He was born in Al-Ala near the historic city of Kairouan. To date, he has published eight novels and two short story collections.

Career
His books include: 
 Jabal al-'Anz (Goat Mountain), 1988
 Surat Badawi Mayyit (Portrait of a Dead Bedouin), 1990
 Matahat al-Raml (Sand Labyrinth), 1994
 Hufar Dafi'a (Warm Pits), 1999
 Ushaq Bayya (Bayya's Lovers), 2002
 Asrar Abdallah (Abdallah’s Secrets), 2006
 Rawaïh Marie-Claire (The Scents of Marie-Claire), 2008
 Nisāʾ al-basatīn (The Women of al-Basatin), 2011
 Al-ishtīāq ilā al-jāra (Longing for the Woman Next Door), 2020
 
His work has been shortlisted three times for the International Prize for Arabic Fiction, in 2009 (for The Scents of Marie-Claire), 2012 (for The Women of al-Basatin), and 2021 (for Longing for the Woman Next Door). His work has been translated into a number of languages, including English and French and has featured in multiple issues of Banipal magazine.

Selmi has lived in Paris since 1985, where he teaches Arabic literature.

References

1951 births
Tunisian novelists
Tunisian male short story writers
People from Kairouan Governorate
Living people